Abdullah Ibrahim Al-Mayouf (born 23 January 1987) is a Saudi Arabian football player who currently plays as a goalkeeper for Al-Hilal FC.

Club career
Abdullah Al-Mayouf started his career at Al-Hilal. He made his first-team debut on 22 September 2004 in the league match against Al-Ansar. He came off the bench in the 73rd minute to replace Sami Al-Jaber after goalkeeper Ali Jabaly was sent off. His next appearance came against Tunisian club Club Africain in the 2004–05 Arab Champions League on 1 March 2005. On 9 May 2005, Al-Mayouf came off the bench to replace the injured Mohamed Al-Deayea in the semi-finals of the Arab Champions League against Al-Ittihad. On 28 May 2005, Al-Mayouf once again replaced Al-Deayea due to injury in the league match against Al-Ittihad. This would be his last appearance for the club.

Al-Ahli
On 31 October 2007, Al-Mayouf joined Al-Ahli following his release by Al-Hilal. He made his debut on 30 December 2007 in the Prince Faisal bin Fahd Cup match against Al-Tai. He made his league debut for Al-Ahli on 13 January 2010 against Al-Qadsiah. He would go on and start the final seven league matches for Al-Ahli. Al-Mayouf also started the 2010 Saudi Crown Prince Cup Final loss against Al-Hilal. On 27 April 2012, Al-Mayouf scored his first goal for Al-Ahli in the King Cup match against Al-Faisaly. On 18 May 2012, Al-Mayouf started the King Cup final against Al-Nassr. On 10 November 2012, Al-Mayouf started 2012 AFC Champions League Final which Al-Ahli went on to lose 3–0 against South Korean side Ulsan Hyundai. On 26 April 2013, Al-Mayouf renewed his contract with Al-Ahli. On 14 February 2015, in the Crown Prince Cup final, Al-Mayouf was sent off and his replacement, Yasser Al-Mosailem, went on to save a penalty. In the 2015–16 season, Al-Mayouf was dropped in favour of Al-Mosailem and he made just eight appearances across all competitions. Following the expiration of his contract, Al-Mayouf refused to sign a new deal and left the club due to personal reasons.

Al-Hilal

2016–17
On 13 August 2016, Abdullah returned to Al-Hilal after nine years with Al-Ahli, signing a two-year contract. On 8 August 2016, Al-Mayouf made his debut against former club Al-Ahli in the 2016 Saudi Super Cup which Al-Hilal lost on penalty shootouts. On 13 August 2016, Abdullah made his league debut for Al-Hilal against Al-Batin and kept a clean sheet in the 2–0 win. On 4 May 2017, Abdullah played the final match of the league against Al-Nassr where they hammered them 5–1 and lifted the league title. He played all of the matches in the league that season. On 18 May 2017, Al-Mayouf played the final of the King Cup against his former club Al-Ahli which they won 3–2.

2017–18
On 10 August 2017, Abdullah played the first match of the season against Al-Fayha, he saved a penalty which made Al-Hilal win 2–1. In 18 December, Abdullah played the AFC Champions League final's first leg against Urawa where they drew 1–1. After that, in 25 November Abdullah and Al-Hilal lost the final in second leg after losing 0–1 against Urawa. In 1 December, Abdullah kept a clean sheet against Al-Ahli, which his team won the match 2–0.

On 22 April 2018, Al-Mayouf renewed his contract with Al-Hilal for another two years. On 5 February 2020, in the league match against Al-Raed, Al-Mayouf saved a penalty and went on to score one to help Al-Hilal win 3–1 and stay at top of the table. On 21 February 2020, Al-Mayouf renewed his contract for another three years.

International career
In June 2018 he was named in Saudi Arabia's squad for the 2018 FIFA World Cup in Russia and played in the tournament's opening match against the hosts. After the match, he was not selected to the two remaining games due to his dismal performance at the opening encounter. On 11 December 2019, it was announced that Al-Mayouf had retired from international football.

Career statistics

Club

International
Statistics accurate as of match played 10 September 2019.

Honours
Al-Hilal
Saudi Professional League: 2004–05, 2016–17, 2017–18, 2019–20, 2020–21, 2021–22
King Cup: 2017, 2019–20
Saudi Super Cup: 2018, 2021
AFC Champions League: 2019, 2021

Al-Ahli
Saudi Professional League: 2015–16
King Cup: 2011, 2012, 2016
Crown Prince Cup: 2014–15
Gulf Club Champions Cup: 2008
Individual
 Saudi Professional League Goalkeeper of the Month: February 2020, October 2020, May & June 2022

References

External links

Living people
1987 births
Association football goalkeepers
Saudi Arabian footballers
Saudi Arabia international footballers
Al-Ahli Saudi FC players
Al Hilal SFC players
Sportspeople from Riyadh
Saudi Professional League players
2018 FIFA World Cup players